Cladocerotis is a genus of moths of the family Noctuidae.

Species
 Cladocerotis optabilis (Boisduval, [1837])

References
 Cladocerotis at Markku Savela's Lepidoptera and Some Other Life Forms
 Natural History Museum Lepidoptera genus database

Noctuinae